Grubenhagen Castle is the name of the following castles in Germany:

* Grubenhagen Castle (Einbeck), a ruined castle near Einbeck, Lower Saxony
 Grubenhagen Castle (Vollrathsruhe), a ruined castle in Schloß Grubenhagen, Mecklenburg-Western Pomerania